Pebbles, Volume 7 may refer to:
Pebbles, Volume 7 (1994 album)
Pebbles, Volume 7 (1980 album)